Actinopus harveyi is a species of mygalomorph spider in the family Actinopodidae. It is indigenous to Brazil.

The specific name harveyi refers to arachnologist Mark S. Harvey.

References 

harveyi
Spiders of Brazil
Spiders described in 2020